The Centre of Advanced Studies on Contemporary China (CASCC) is a research institute headquartered in Torino, Italy.  It is incorporated as a private  foundation, established by the University of Torino, the University of Eastern Piedmont, the Politecnico of Torino, the Italian Ministry of Foreign Affairs and several other public and private institutions.  The CASCC has strong collaboration with the China-EU Law School.

See also
University of Torino
Law Centres/Institutes on Chinese Law
Chinese law
UNITO Law Faculty

References
Official website

Legal research institutes
Organisations based in Turin
Education in Turin
University of Turin